The Buick Velite is a roadster concept car designed by Buick and built by Gruppo Bertone. It was first presented to the public at the 2004 New York International Auto Show.

In 2002, Buick showed a roadster concept car that they called the Bengal. It was widely thought to be an impressive exercise in styling, but it was never considered to be a viable production vehicle.

Originally speculated to use the Kappa platform (the basis that underpins the Pontiac Solstice and the Saturn Sky roadsters), in actuality the Velite makes use of the Zeta platform — which is shared with the Holden Commodore/2008 Pontiac G8, as well as the fifth-generation Chevrolet Camaro.

External links 
Automobile.com: Buick Velite Concept

References

Bertone vehicles
Velite